Newpark railway station was a railway station serving Newpark near Bellsquarry in West Lothian, then called Linlithgowshire. It was on the Cleland and Midcalder Line between Edinburgh and Glasgow. Trains on the Shotts Line still pass through the site of the former station.

History
It was situated where the Murieston Road crosses over the line. Once was surrounded by fields, the station site is now on the south west edge Livingston, with housing to the north and south of the station site although fields remain to the west. The station site can still be seen from aerial views.

References

Notes

Sources
 
 
 
 

Disused railway stations in West Lothian
Former Caledonian Railway stations
Railway stations in Great Britain opened in 1869
Railway stations in Great Britain closed in 1959
Livingston, West Lothian
1869 establishments in Scotland